The Winter in Lisbon is a soundtrack album for the European film of the same name directed by José A. Zorrilla composed and performed by trumpeter Dizzy Gillespie in 1990 and released on the Milan label. The album represents the final studio recordings by the trumpet legend.

Reception
The Allmusic review stated "as with most soundtracks, the music sounds incomplete without the picture". The Guardian review stated "it's a full-on jazz album, with Gillespie fronting a fine band... A fine way to remember a few more of a jazz giant's final choruses".

Track listing
All compositions by Dizzy Gillespie except as indicated
 "Opening Theme" (Charles Fishman, Gillespie) - 3:28 
 "San Sebastian" - 5:55 
 "Lucretia's Theme" (Gillespie, Danilo Pérez) - 3:38 
 "Magic Summer" [Vocal Version] (Fishman, Gillespie, Leola Jiles) - 5:26 
 "Isthmus" - 8:12 
 "Magic Summer" [Orchestral Version] (Fishman, Gillespie) - 2:30 
 "Lisbon" - 6:09 
 "Magic Summer" [Piano Version] (Fishman, Gillespie) - 4:59 
 "Burma" (Gillespie, Pérez) - 8:08 
 "Bill's Song" - 2:17 
 "Final Theme" (Fishman, Gillespie) - 5:48

Personnel
Dizzy Gillespie - trumpet
Leola Jiles - vocals
Mario Rivera - flute, soprano saxophone
Danilo Pérez - piano
George Mraz - bass
Grady Tate - - drums
Richard Spencer - viola
Bob Carlisle - French horn
Sandra Billingslea - violin
Akua Dixon - cello

References 

Milan Records soundtracks
Dizzy Gillespie soundtracks
1991 soundtrack albums